Bazgir or Baz Gir may refer to:
Afghanistan
Bazgir, Badakhshan, Afghanistan
Bazgir, Helmand, Afghanistan
Bazgir, Orūzgān, Afghanistan
Iran
Baz Gir, Golestan, Iran
Bazgir, Hormozgan, Iran
Bazgir, Kerman, Iran
Bazgir, Kermanshah, Iran
Bazgir, Lorestan, Iran